Several different minor league baseball teams played in the city of Oakland, California in the California League (and its alternate names) starting in 1879 until 1915. From that point, the Oakland Oaks of the Pacific Coast League took over as the main team in Oakland.

External links
Baseball Reference

Baseball teams established in 1879
Baseball teams disestablished in 1915
Professional baseball teams in California
Sports teams in Oakland, California
Defunct California League teams
Defunct California State League teams
Defunct Pacific Coast League teams
Defunct New California League teams
Defunct Central California League teams
Defunct San Francisco City League teams
Defunct California Winter League teams
Defunct California Players League teams
Defunct baseball teams in California
1879 establishments in California
1915 disestablishments in California